Bellator 291: Amosov vs. Storley 2 (also known as Bellator Dublin) was a mixed martial arts event produced by Bellator MMA, that took place on February 25, 2023, at the 3Arena in Dublin, Ireland.

Background 
On February 25, Bellator hosted an event in the 3Arena in Dublin, Ireland. The event, which was Bellator's tenth event in the nation, after first debuting there in 2016. The promotion stated that the most recent event broke the 3Arena's attendance record.

A Bellator Welterweight World Championship unification bout between current champion Yaroslav Amosov and interim champion Logan Storley headlined the event. The pair previously met at Bellator 252, where Amosov won via split decision.

A featherweight bout between Ciarán Clarke and Keir Harvie was scheduled for this event. However, Harvie pulled out of the bout due to injury two weeks before the event and was replaced by Leonardos Sinis at a catchweight of 147.5 pounds.

A welterweight bout between Oliver Enkamp and Luca Poclit was scheduled for this event. However, Enkamp had to pull out of the bout due to injury.

At the weigh-ins, Leonardos Sinis weighed in at 148.8 pounds, 1.3 pounds over the 147.5 pounds fight limit. The bout proceeded at catchweight with Sinis being fined 20% of his purse, which went to his opponent Ciarán Clarke.

Results

See also 

 2023 in Bellator MMA
 List of Bellator MMA events
 List of current Bellator fighters
 Bellator MMA Rankings

References 

Bellator MMA events
Events in Dublin (city)
2023 in mixed martial arts
2023 in Irish sport
Mixed martial arts in Ireland
Sports competitions in Dublin (city)
2020s in Dublin (city)
February 2023 sports events in Europe